Glutamate [NMDA] receptor subunit epsilon-2, also known as N-methyl D-aspartate receptor subtype 2B (NMDAR2B or NR2B), is a protein that in humans is encoded by the GRIN2B gene.

NMDA receptors 
N-methyl-D-aspartate (NMDA) receptors are a class of ionotropic glutamate receptors. The NMDA receptor channel has been shown to be involved in long-term potentiation, an activity-dependent increase in the efficiency of synaptic transmission thought to underlie certain kinds of memory and learning. NMDA receptor channels are heterotetramers composed of two molecules of the key receptor subunit NMDAR1 (GRIN1) and two drawn from one or more of the four NMDAR2 subunits: NMDAR2A (GRIN2A), NMDAR2B (GRIN2B), NMDAR2C (GRIN2C), and NMDAR2D (GRIN2D). The NR2 subunit acts as the agonist binding site for glutamate, one of the predominant excitatory neurotransmitter receptors in the mammalian brain.

Function 
NR2B has been associated with age- and visual-experience-dependent plasticity in the neocortex of rats, where an increased NR2B/NR2A ratio correlates directly with the stronger excitatory LTP in young animals. This is thought to contribute to experience-dependent refinement of developing cortical circuits.

Engineered to overexpress GRIN2B in their brains, mice and rats exhibit improved mental function. The "Doogie" mouse performed twice as well on one learning test.

Ligands 
 Besonprodil
 CERC-301, a selective NR2B receptor antagonist
 Eliprodil
 Ethanol - apparent induction of dephosphorylation of the NR2B Tyr1472 residue by STEP, leading to reduced receptor function
 Ifenprodil
 Rislenemdaz 
 Evt 101, a selective NR2B receptor antagonist. This compound was tested as a potentially fast-acting antidepressant. In 2011 it was voluntarily withdrawn from a Phase II clinical study in treatment-resistant depression due to an unsatisfactory toxicity profile.
 Felbamate, an anticonvulsant that is also a positive allosteric modulator for the GABAA receptor
 Ro-25-6981 (also known as MI-4), a selective NR2B receptor antagonist
 Traxoprodil, a selective NR2B receptor antagonist
 Toluene - noncompetitive antagonist

Interactions 

GRIN2B has been shown to interact with:

 Actinin, alpha 2,
 DLG2, 
 DLG3, 
 DLG4, 
 EXOC4, 
 LIN7B,  and
 RICS.

See also 
 NMDA receptor
 Glutamate receptor

References

Further reading 

 
 
 
 
 
 
 
 
 
 
 
 
 
 
 
 
 
 
 

Ionotropic glutamate receptors